The chestnut antpitta (Grallaria blakei) is a species of bird in the family Grallariidae. It is endemic to Peru. In 2020, two new species previously believed to be populations of chestnut pitta were described: the Oxapampa antpitta and the Ayacucho antpitta; this has left the chestnut antpitta with a much reduced range.

Its natural habitat is subtropical or tropical moist montane forest. It is threatened by habitat loss.

Conservation
The chestnut antpitta is currently assessed to be of least concern by the IUCN Red List due to its disjunct distribution and the threat of deforestation. However, the species was split into three different species in 2020, and so all three need to be reassessed in light of their more restricted ranges.

References

chestnut antpitta
Birds of the Peruvian Andes
Endemic birds of Peru
chestnut antpitta
Taxonomy articles created by Polbot